The National Museum of Lubumbashi is a museum with core collections in archaeology and ethnography in Lubumbashi, Haut-Katanga Province in the Democratic Republic of the Congo. It was founded in 1946.

References

External links
 BiennaledeLubumbashi.org National Museum of Lubumbashi

Further reading
 Henry Bundioko Banyaïa:Les objets des musées. Pour un savoir africain, d'hier à demain (expérience du Musée national de Lubumbashi). In: Anne-Marie Bouttiaux (dir.), Afrique: musées et patrimoines, pour quels publics?. Karthala, Paris; Musée royal de l'Afrique centrale, Tervuren; Culture lab éd., 2007, pp.73-76 
 Bundjoko Banyata: Le musée national de Lubumbashi comme lieu de sociabilité et d'élaboration culturelle. In: Cahiers africains', 2005, No 71, pp.301-322
 Donatien Muya wa Bitanko Kamwanga: Le musée post-colonial et la coopération internationale: cas du Musée national de Lubumbashi. In: Anne-Marie Bouttiaux (dir.), Afrique: musées et patrimoines, pour quels publics?. Karthala, Paris; Musée royal de l'Afrique centrale, Tervuren; Culture lab éd., 2007, pp.35-39 
 Joseph Cornet: Zaire, l'Institut des musées nationaux. In: Critica d'Arte Africana, Spring 1984, pp.84-92
 Anne Gaugue: Les États africains et leurs musées: La mise en scène de la Nation. Éditions L'Harmattan, 1997, p. 170 
 Guy de Plaen: Le Musée de Lubumbashi: un musée zaïrois tout à fait particulier. In: Museum International, vol. 41, No 2, 1989, pp.124-126
 Sarah Van Beurden: Forty years of IMNC: 11 March 1970-11 March 2010: Salle Joseph Aurélien Cornet, Institute for National Museums of Congo, Mont Ngliema, Kinshasa, Democratic Republic of Congo. In: African Arts'', 45:4, Winter 2012, pp.90-93

Buildings and structures in Lubumbashi
Museums in the Democratic Republic of the Congo
1946 establishments in the Belgian Congo